Cohaesibacter haloalkalitolerans is a bacterium from the genus of Cohaesibacter.

References

External links
Type strain of Cohaesibacter haloalkalitolerans at BacDive -  the Bacterial Diversity Metadatabase

 

Hyphomicrobiales
Bacteria described in 2013